Manzanal de Arriba is a municipality located in the province of Zamora, Castile and León, Spain. According to the 2004 census (INE), the municipality has a population of 439 inhabitants.

See also
Sandin
List of municipalities in Zamora

References

External links

Municipalities of the Province of Zamora